Celiptera is a genus of moths in the family Erebidae.

Species
 Celiptera carbonensis Barbut & Lalanne-Cassou, 2003
 Celiptera codo Dyar, 1912
 Celiptera cometephora Hampson, 1913
 Celiptera frustulum Guenée, 1852
 Celiptera grisescens (Schaus, 1901)
 Celiptera guerreronis (Draudt, 1940)
 Celiptera levinum (Stoll, 1782)
 Celiptera remigioides (Guenee, 1852)
 Celiptera teretilinea (Guenee, 1852)
 Celiptera thericles Schaus, 1913
 Celiptera valina Schaus, 1901
 Celiptera virginiae Barbut & Lalanne-Cassou, 2003

References

 , 2003. – Description de deux nouvelles espèces néotropicales du genre Celiptera Guenée (Lepidoptera, Noctuidae, Catocalinae). Bulletin de la Société Entomologique de France 108 (4): 377–382.
 ;  2010: Annotated check list of the Noctuoidea (Insecta, Lepidoptera) of North America north of Mexico. ZooKeys, 40: 1–239.

External links
 Celiptera at Markku Savela's Lepidoptera and Some Other Life Forms
 Natural History Museum Lepidoptera genus database

 
Euclidiini
Moth genera